Thiomicrospira aerophila (basonynm: Thioalkalimicrobium aerophilum) is an obligately alkaliphilic and obligately chemolithoautotrophic sulfur-oxidizing bacterium that was previously the type species of Thioalkalimicrobium prior to reclassification in 2017. It was first isolated from soda lakes in northern Russia.

References

Further reading

Seckbach, Joseph, Aharon Oren, and Helga Stan-Lotter, eds. Polyextremophiles: Life under multiple forms of stress. Vol. 27. Springer, 2013.

External links
LPSN

Type strain of Thioalkalimicrobium aerophilum at BacDive -  the Bacterial Diversity Metadatabase

Thiomicrospira
Piscirickettsiaceae
Halophiles
Alkaliphiles
Bacteria described in 2001